is a Japanese singer. She graduated from SDN48 as a 1st generation member.

Songs

Album songs
1 Gallon no Ase (Next Encore)

SDN single (Senbatsu member)
GAGAGA (1st single)
Kudokinagara Azabujuuban Duet With Mino Monta (4th single)
Makeoshimi Congratulation (5th single)

SDN B-side (as undergirl)
Kodoku na Runner (GAGAGA)
Tengoku no Door wa 3kaime no Bell de Aku (ai, Chuseyo)
Onedari Champagne (MIN.MIN.MIN)
Owaranai Encore (Makeoshimi Congratulation) (Graduation Song)

Units

Team Z
Koi no Owara

Stage units

SDN1 "Yuuwaku no Garter"
Saturday Night Party (1#)
Never! (2#)
Black Boy (3#)
 (UNIT) Yuuwaku no Garter (4#)
Ganbariina (8#)
Futsuu no Anata (9#)
Best By... (10#)
Aisareru Tame ni (11#)
Kodoku na Runner (Encore 1)
Touhikou (Encore 2)
Vampire Keikaku (Encore 3)

Solo songs
Haruiro no Tsubasa

Minogashita Kimitachi e ~AKB48 Group Zenkouen

Unit songs
Saturday Night Party, Never, Black Boy, Tengoku no Door wa 3kaime no Bell de Aku, Ganbariina, Futsuu no Anata, Best By..., Kodoku na Runner, Touhikou, Vampire Keikaku, GAGAGA.

With all the group
Aisareru Tame ni.

"NEXT ENCORE"

Unit songs
Saturday Night Party, Never, Tengoku no Door wa 3kaime no Bell de Aku, Kudokinagara Azabujuuban, Haruiro no Tsubasa, Yuuwaku no Garter, Onedari Champagne, GAGAGA.

Shuffle songs
Futsuu no Anata, Ganbariina.

With all the 39 members
Sado e Wataru, Black Boy, Awajishima no Tamanegi, 1 Gallon no Ase, Aisareru Tame Ni, Touhikou, Vampire Keikaku, Kodoku na Runner, Makeoshimi Congratulation, Owaranai Encore, Kodoku na Runner (Replace)

Minogashita Kimitachi e 2 ~AKB48 Group Zenkouen

Unit songs
Saturday Night Party, Never, Black Boy, Touhikou, Vampire Keikaku, GAGAGA.

With all the Group
Aisareru Tame ni, Kodoku na Runner, Min. Min. Min., Makeoshimi Congratulation.

References

SDN48 members
Japanese women singers
People from Ikeda, Osaka
Musicians from Osaka Prefecture
1985 births
Living people